Jaklein Al-Duqom (born March 10, 1964) is a Jordanian Olympic table tennis player. She represented Jordan in 1988 Summer Olympics in Seoul.

Olympic participation

Seoul 1988

Table tennis – Women's Singles – Preliminary Round

References

1964 births
Living people
Table tennis players at the 1988 Summer Olympics
Jordanian female table tennis players
Olympic table tennis players of Jordan